The 2019 Balkan Athletics Indoor Championships was the 24th edition of the annual indoor track and field competition for athletes from the Balkans, organised by Balkan Athletics. It was held on 16 February at the Ataköy Athletics Arena in Istanbul, Turkey.

In a closely contested competition, Ukraine and the host nation Turkey each won four gold medals. Romania won the most medals overall, with a haul of 12, followed by Turkey on 11. Ukraine won the most women's events, with three, and Romanian won the most women's medals in total, with seven. Turkey was the most dominant in the men's side, having the highest medal total of seven and also the most gold medals, with three.

Results

Men

Women

References

Results
24th BALKAN INDOOR SENIOR CHAMPIONSHIPS Men. Balkan Athletics. Retrieved 2019-08-03.
24th BALKAN INDOOR SENIOR CHAMPIONSHIPS Women. Balkan Athletics. Retrieved 2019-08-03.

External links
Balkan Athletics website

2019
Balkan Athletics Indoor Championships
Balkan Athletics Indoor Championships
Balkan Athletics Indoor Championships
Balkan Athletics Indoor Championships
Balkan Athletics Indoor Championships
International athletics competitions hosted by Turkey
Sports competitions in Istanbul